George Wilfred Cummings (5 June 1913 – 9 April 1987) was a Scottish footballer of the 1930s and 1940s, who played as a left back.

Club career
Cummings was the captain of Aston Villa's great post-World War II defence, having signed for the club in November 1935 from Partick Thistle, where he had made a total of 138 appearances in all competitions, scoring one goal, and won a Glasgow Cup medal with the Jags in 1934.

At Villa Park, Cummings gained a Second Division championship medal in 1938 and a Football League War Cup tankard in 1944, also guesting for several teams (including hometown club Falkirk) during the conflict. He was the Villains club captain from 1945 to his retirement in 1949, and was popular with supporters due to his never-say-die spirit and no-nonsense defending. He played 421 times for the club in total, including wartime competitions – his peacetime total being just over half of that.

On retirement as a player he was a youth coach at Aston Villa for three years, and also worked for the Dunlop Rubber Company and Hardy Spicer Ltd. in Birmingham.

International career
Cummings represented both Scotland (nine caps, three while at Partick Thistle) and the Scottish League XI (two caps), also playing in an SFA tour of North America in 1935 and in one wartime international in 1944.

References

External links

1913 births
1987 deaths
Scottish footballers
Footballers from Falkirk
Partick Thistle F.C. players
Aston Villa F.C. players
Birmingham City F.C. wartime guest players
Falkirk F.C. wartime guest players
Nottingham Forest F.C. wartime guest players
Scotland international footballers
Scottish Junior Football Association players
Scottish Football League players
English Football League players
Scottish Football League representative players
Association football fullbacks
Scotland wartime international footballers
Association football coaches
Aston Villa F.C. non-playing staff
Scotland junior international footballers